Netherton is a hamlet in the parish of Linkinhorne, Cornwall, England.

References

Hamlets in Cornwall